Five referendums were held in Switzerland in 1891. The first was held on 15 March on a federal law on federal officials who had become unemployable due to disability, and was rejected by 79.4% of voters. The second was held on 5 July on a constitutional amendment, and was approved by 60.3% of voters. Two referendums were held on 18 October, one on revising article 39 of the federal constitution and one on a federal law on Swiss tariffs; both were approved. The last was held on 6 December on the question of whether the federal government should purchase the Swiss Central Railway, but was rejected by 68.9% of voters.

Background
The two constitutional referendums were mandatory referendums, which required both a majority of voters and cantons. The other three were optional referendums, which meant that only a majority of the public vote was required for the proposals to be approved.

Results

Federal officials law

Constitutional amendment (July)

Constitutional amendment (October)

Tariffs

Central railway purchase

References

1891 referendums
1891 in Switzerland
Referendums in Switzerland